The Motor City Comic Con is a fan convention held in Novi, Michigan, United States, at the Suburban Collection Showplace. It is traditionally a three-day event (Friday through Sunday), usually held in May of each year. The Motor City Comic Con was founded in 1989 by comics retailer Michael Goldman.

Though it primarily focuses on comic books, the convention features a large range of pop culture elements, such as film actors, professional wrestling, science fiction/fantasy, film/television, animation, anime, manga, toys, horror, collectible card games, video games, webcomics, and fantasy novels. Along with panels, seminars, and workshops with comic book professionals, there are previews of upcoming feature films, portfolio review sessions with top comic book and video game companies, and such evening events as a costume contest. Traditional events include gaming and hours of other programming on all aspects of comic books and pop culture.

The Motor City Comic Con features a large floorspace for exhibitors. These include media companies such as movie studios and TV networks, as well as comic-book dealers and collectibles merchants. Like most comics conventions, the show includes an autograph area, as well as the Artists' Alley where comics artists can sign autographs and sell or do free sketches. Despite the name, Artists' Alley can include writers and even glamour models.

History 
Southfield, Michigan, comic book retailer Michael Goldman, owner of Motor City Comics, staged the first Motor City Comic Con at the Dearborn Civic Center in 1989. Antecedents to the Motor City Comic Con include the seminal multi-genre convention, the Detroit Triple Fan Fair, which was held annually in the Detroit area from 1965 to 1978; and Gary Reed's King Kon, held in the area from 1984-1986.

Show promoter Goldman brought on Gary Bishop in 1989 to manage the convention; Bishop worked for Motor City Conventions until 2007. From 1992–1998, the Motor City Comic Con was the site of the Compuserve Comics and Animation Forum's Don Thompson Awards (also known as the Thompsons). From 1993–2004, the convention was held twice a year, once in the spring and once in the fall. Typically the larger three-day spring convention was held in Novi and the smaller two-day fall show was held at the Dearborn Civic Center.

The fall 1998 show hosted the convention's fourth annual Red Cross blood drive and the seventh annual charity art auction to benefit of the Muscular Dystrophy Association. By this point, the Motor City Comic Con had raised nearly $35,000 to benefit the Muscular Dystrophy Association. In 1999, Goldman claimed the Motor City Comic Con was the third-largest comic convention in the United States.

By 2003, the most popular elements of the Motor City Comic Con were the appearances of celebrities from the world of film, television, and other media; rather than the comic book creators who were the namesake of the show. (This mirrored the situation at other so-called comic book conventions nationwide.)

In fall 2005, after many years of being held at the Novi Expo Center, the facility closed and the convention moved to the newly built Rock Financial Showplace (later renamed the Suburban Collection Showplace).

In 2010, Motor City Comic Con scheduled a fall component to its show for the weekend of October 30–31. That same weekend was the debut of the new show Detroit Fanfare; Motor City Comic Con changed its fall show to November 20–21, and later canceled the fall 2010 show altogether.

The 2020 edition of the show was cancelled due to the COVID-19 pandemic.

The 2021 edition was held in October of that year, but COVID precautions were put in place so guests, VIPs, and artists would be safer until the pandemic began to slow down. The 2022 edition would be held back in its original month of May.

Dates and locations

References

External links 
 

Comics conventions in the United States
Multigenre conventions
Gaming conventions
Science fiction conventions in the United States
Recurring events established in 1989
Culture of Detroit
Tourist attractions in Detroit
1989 establishments in Michigan
Festivals established in 1989
Conventions in Michigan
Novi, Michigan